Alexandra Sokoloff is an American novelist and screenwriter, and the author of the Thriller award-nominated Huntress/FBI series, following a haunted FBI agent on the hunt for a female serial killer (Huntress Moon, Blood Moon, Cold Moon, published by Thomas & Mercer in 2015).

Career
Her first novel, The Harrowing, was published by St. Martin's Press in 2006. Her second novel, The Price, was published by St. Martin's in 2007, her third, The Unseen, in 2009, her fourth, "Book of Shadows", in 2010.  She is a Bram Stoker and Anthony award nominee and a Thriller award winner, and the co-author of the paranormal mystery romance series "The Keepers".

Her short story "The Edge of Seventeen" was the recipient of a 2009 International Thriller Writers Award.

She also co-wrote the screenplay for the psychological thriller Cold Kisses, and two books on story structure, "Story Structure" and "Writing Love", based on her Screenwriting Tricks for Authors workshops and blog.

She lives in Los Angeles and in Scotland, with her husband, the Scottish crime author Craig Robertson.

External links
 
 
 

Year of birth missing (living people)
Living people
21st-century American novelists
Screenwriters from California
American women screenwriters
American women novelists
21st-century American women writers
Screenwriting instructors
21st-century American screenwriters